Kali Pasir Mosque is the oldest mosque in Tangerang city, a relic of Pajajaran Kingdom. It is located in Cisadane riverbank, in the middle of Chinese residential and is characterized by it Chinese pattern.

History 

The mosque was established in 1700 by Tumenggung Pamit Wijaya from Bogor Kahuripan and is approximately 288 square meters. Originally, Tumenggung Pamit Wijaya wanted to do syiar Islam from Cirebon Sultanate to Banten but he stopped in Tangerang and established a mosque. Construction of the mosque carried out by Muslims with the assistance of ethnic Chinese. In 1712 the management of the mosque was passed to his son, Raden Bagus Uning Wiradilaga. The mosque has deen repeatedly renovated, but the building is still stylized Arabic, Chinese and European. Currently, only two parts of the architecture that still complete retained, the four pillars in the mosque and the small dome with China pattern.

References 

Mosques in Indonesia
Religious buildings and structures completed in 1700
1700 establishments in Asia